This table of client applications for the Distributed Annotation System has been created primarily for inclusion in its parent page. The parent page puts the table in context, and you should go there for more information. The table is provided in a separate page so that it can be transcluded where necessary.

 Table follows 

Bioinformatics